Messier 78 or M78, also known as NGC 2068, is a reflection nebula in the constellation Orion. It was discovered by Pierre Méchain in 1780 and included by Charles Messier in his catalog of comet-like objects that same year.

M78 is the brightest diffuse reflection nebula of a group of nebulae that includes NGC 2064, NGC 2067 and NGC 2071. This group belongs to the Orion B molecular cloud complex and is about  distant from Earth. M78 is easily found in small telescopes as a hazy patch and involves two stars of 10th and 11th magnitude.

The M78 cloud contains a cluster of stars that is visible in the infrared. About 45 variable stars of the T Tauri type, young stars still in the process of formation, are members as well. Similarly, 17 Herbig–Haro objects are known in M78.

Gallery

See also
 List of Messier objects

References

External links

 
 SEDS: Starforming Nebula M78
 
 NightSkyInfo.com – M78
 Astronomy Picture of the Day
 M78 Wide Field 2009 November 26
 M78 and Reflecting Dust Clouds in Orion 2010 March 2
 

Messier 078
Messier 078
Orion–Cygnus Arm
Messier 078
078
Messier 078
Astronomical objects discovered in 1780
Discoveries by Pierre Méchain